The BRICS Cable is a planned optical fibre submarine communications cable system that carries telecommunications between the BRICS countries, specifically Brazil, Russia, India, China and South Africa. The cable was announced in 2012 but was still under construction as of 2015. The project aims to provide bandwidth around the Southern Hemisphere of the globe, and to "ensure that developing nations’ communications are not all in the hands of the nations of the North".

The cable will be the third-longest cable in the world by the time of its completion. It will interconnect with the WACS cable on the West coast of Africa, and the EASSy and SEACOM cables on the East coast of the continent.

According to The Diplomat, there is a growing wariness among the BRICS countries that when their data traffic goes through hubs in Europe or the United States, it incurs a greater "risk of potential interception of critical financial and security information by non-BRICS entities".

The BRICS cable is intended "to circumvent the U.S. and NSA spying through ports in Russia, China, Singapore, India, Mauritius, South Africa, and Brazil".

According to The BRICS Post, Brazilian former President Dilma Rousseff considers the US spying regimen "unacceptable", and postponed an official visit to the US in protest. She has also pushed a new internet bill that would force Google, Facebook, and other networks to store locally gathered data in the country within Brazil, data which would then be governed by Brazilian privacy laws.

The landing points are Miami (U.S.), Fortaleza (Brazil), Cape Town (South Africa), Mauritius, Chennai (India), Singapore, Shantou (China), and Vladivostok (Russia).

See also
WACS
EASSy
SEACOM

References

Internet in Brazil
Internet in Russia
Internet in India
Internet in China
Internet in Africa
Submarine communications cables in the Indian Ocean
Submarine communications cables in the Atlantic Ocean
Wide area networks
BRICS